Tom Wolfenden (born 23 February 1994) is a badminton player from England. He started playing badminton at aged 6, he won U-19 England national badminton championships five times, and became the England's Young Player of the year 2012-13.

Achievements

BWF Grand Prix 
The BWF Grand Prix has two level such as Grand Prix and Grand Prix Gold. It is a series of badminton tournaments, sanctioned by Badminton World Federation (BWF) since 2007.

Men's doubles

 BWF Grand Prix Gold tournament
 BWF Grand Prix tournament

BWF International Challenge/Series
Men's doubles

 BWF International Challenge tournament
 BWF International Series tournament
 BWF Future Series tournament

References

External links
 

1994 births
Living people
Sportspeople from Liverpool
English male badminton players